Jafarabad (also Romanized as Ja‘farābād; also known as Ja‘farābād-e Zavāreh) is a village in Rigestan Rural District, Zavareh District, Ardestan County, Isfahan Province, Iran. At the 2006 census, its population was 50, in 14 families.

References 

Populated places in Ardestan County